Želízy is a municipality and village in Mělník District in the Central Bohemian Region of the Czech Republic. It has about 500 inhabitants.

Administrative parts
Villages of Nové Tupadly and Sitné are administrative parts of Želízy.

Geography
It lies in the Ralsko Uplands. The Liběchovka Stream flows through the municipality. Most of the municipal territory lies in the Kokořínsko – Máchův kraj Protected Landscape Area.

History
The first written mention of Želízy is from 1360.

In the 19th century, Želízy became a summer resort. In the interwar period it was a popular resort destination visited by hundreds of guests, especially by German-speaking Jews of Prague, including Franz Kafka.

Sights
Želízy is known for the Čertovy hlavy, sculptures from the first half of the 19th century carved in the sandstone above the village of Želízy.

Most of the village of Sitné is protected by law as a village monument zone for its set of folk architecture wooden houses from the turn of the 18th and 19th centuries.

References

External links

Villages in Mělník District